Lester Rodney (April 17, 1911 – December 20, 2009) was an American journalist who helped break down the color barrier in baseball as sports writer for the Daily Worker.

Early life
Rodney was born in Manhattan, New York City, the third of four children of Isabel Cotton and Max Rodney.  The Rodneys moved from the Bronx to Brooklyn when Lester was 6, where his lifelong love of the Dodgers developed.  Rodney’s father lost his business, and then the family home, in the 1929 stock market crash that began the Great Depression, an era in which communism and other radical social philosophies captured the attention of the intelligentsia.  Rodney earned a partial track scholarship to Syracuse University, but his family could not afford the other half of his tuition so he did not complete his formal education.  To supplement the family income, he took odd jobs, including helping his attorney brother-in-law and chauffeuring rich children to school.

Sports writer for the Daily Worker
Rodney's favorite jobs though involved sports, and in 1936 he parlayed his high school background in sportswriting into a job with the Daily Worker and its Sunday edition, the Sunday Worker, the party organ of the Communist Party USA, or CPUSA. There Rodney was able to combine sports journalism with his developing sense of social justice, to champion social issues, most notably the desegregation of major league baseball. Many American Jews felt as persecuted as African Americans, and it was not a stretch for a young Jewish intellectual to see the contradiction of the fight against Hitler's bigotry and the continued oppression of black people in the United States. Rodney was given wide discretion in his sportswriting, permitted to criticize baseball, America, and Hitler in order to prove his point that some African American ballplayers were equal to white major leaguers. Before Rodney worked for the Daily Worker, the sports column was basically used to tell workers that they were stupid for being interested in U.S sports. Rodney felt strongly about this, and wrote a letter to the  Editor of the paper Clarence Hathaway, explaining that he believed the sports column needs to write about why U.S workers find sports meaningful to them. The editor amazingly responded to Rodney and offered him the job to write the sports page. He started to write about sports in a way that was not seen in other newspapers at the time, focusing on the importance of the social impact. He did investigative reporting on the relationship of race and sports. He highlighted the good negro league baseball players, and mentioned their background and history. He was a key factor in the start of the campaign to integrate baseball in the 1930s. In an interview in Dave Zirin's book What's My Name, Fool? Rodney says after he started reporting on Negro players, he realized the "huge void that no one is talking about. This is America, land of the free, and people with the wrong pigmentation of skin can't play baseball?" Rodney was always looking for more evidence that baseball should be interracial, and asked white players how they feel about an integration. They all said they would stand by it, in contrary to what the owners of the baseball teams believed. He leveled much of this criticism at Branch Rickey, the general manager of his beloved Dodgers.

Rodney served in the South Pacific in World War II, and it was during his service that Branch Rickey announced the signing of Los Angeles native and war veteran Jackie Robinson to a minor league contract. World War II had a positive effect on the integration of baseball because there were black men fighting and dying for the U.S, yet they were not able play in the Major Leagues. Rodney's paper was the first to scout Robinson and had touted his abilities for nine long years leading up to this event, and Daily Worker editor Mike Gold wrote an editorial praising Rodney’s efforts as bringing desegregation to fruition.  Rodney was one of the few white sportswriters of his time to devote a great deal of space and praise to black athletes.  One of his closest friends was Satchel Paige, who he covered a lot on his page because he was one of the best pitchers ever at the time, but did not get the career and recognition that he deserved because he was in the Negro League.  His sports page often carried more stories about Joe Louis and Kenny Washington than on those white athletes whose prowess was the subject of the mainstream papers. Rodney's outspoken commentary often publicly pitted him against other sportswriters, but they would often offer information for Rodney to publish what they could not themselves use. Soon after returning from the war, Rodney met the woman who would become his second wife, Clare, a lifelong educator, and they were married on April 21, 1946. Rodney stayed with the Daily Worker until the mid-1950s, keeping on top of racial issues in sports.

Fresh start in California
Following Nikita Khrushchev's 1956 Secret Speech detailing the crimes of the Joseph Stalin era, Rodney joined Daily Worker editor John Gates in an attempt to open the pages of the paper to debate.  CPUSA leaders suppressed this staff revolt, and suspended publication of the paper as a daily. After 22 years as the Daily Worker'''s sports writer, Rodney resigned from the CPUSA and the paper in January 1958 to seek a new life in California.  The Rodneys moved from New York to Torrance, California, in 1958, where they lived for 31 years. Rodney continued to work as a journalist, most notably as the Religion editor of the Long-Beach Press Telegram. The Rodneys had two children, Amy and Ray, and later a granddaughter, Jessie. Rodney kept active all his life playing sports, and in his 60s saw success in his senior amateur tennis career, ranking as the #1 or #2 player in his age group in California until retiring from competition in 1998. In 1990, the Rodneys moved again, this time to Walnut Creek, California. Clare died in May 2004.

Rodney was inducted into the Baseball Reliquary's Shrine of the Eternals in 2005.

Rodney celebrated his 96th birthday on April 17, 2007 in Walnut Creek, California with his partner, Mary Reynolds Harvey. Rodney died on December 20, 2009.<ref>Richard Goldstein, "Lester Rodney, Early Voice in Fight Against Racism in Sports, Dies at 98," The New York Times, December 24, 2009, p. B9.</ref>

Notes

References
Klein, Robert.  "Lester Rodney."  Orodenker, Richard, ed. American Sportswriters and Writers on Sport. Dictionary of Literary Biography, v. 241. Detroit: The Gale Group, 2001.
Dorinson, Joseph, and Woramund, Joram, eds. Jackie Robinson: Race, Sports and the American Dream. New York: E.M. Swift, 1998.
Silber, Irwin. Press Box Red: The Story of Lester Rodney, the Communist Who Helped Break the Color Line in American Sports.  Philadelphia: Temple University Press, 2003.  
Rusinack, Kelly.  Baseball on the Radical Agenda: The Daily and Sunday Worker on the Desegregation of Major League Baseball, 1933-1947.  Master's Thesis.  Clemson University, 1995.

Zirin, Dave. What's My Name, Fool?: Sports and Resistance in United States. ReadHowYouWant.com Ltd, 2011.

1911 births
2009 deaths
Activists for African-American civil rights
American male journalists
American communists
American Marxists
American military personnel of World War II
Jewish anti-racism activists
Jewish socialists
American anti-racism activists
Members of the Communist Party USA
Jewish American writers
American Marxist journalists
Journalists from New York City